The men's double sculls event was part of the rowing programme at the 1924 Summer Olympics. The competition, the third appearance of the event, was held from 15 to 17 July 1924 on the river Seine.

Five pairs, each from a different nation, competed.

Results

Semifinals

The top two boats in each semifinal qualified for the final; only one team of five was eliminated.

Final

References

External links
 

Sculls, double